Matthias Merz (born 1 February 1984) is a Swiss orienteering competitor, winner of the 2007 World Orienteering Championships in Kyiv, Ukraine, Long distance, and also earned a silver medal on the Sprint distance in the same championship. He has a bronze medal from the 2005 Relay Championships in Aichi, Japan, as member of the Swiss winning team. When Merz won the bronze medal in the middle distance at the World Championships in Miskolc in 2009, he joined countryman Daniel Hubmann as the only two men to have ever medaled in all four orienteering disciplines at the World Championships.

He on 30 December 2007, he was ranked no. 2 on the IOF (International Orienteering Federation) World Ranking.

References

External links

1984 births
Living people
Swiss orienteers
Male orienteers
Foot orienteers
World Orienteering Championships medalists
Competitors at the 2005 World Games
Junior World Orienteering Championships medalists